Russell Cunningham (December 29, 1905 – March 6, 1985) was a Canadian social democratic politician from Cape Breton Island in Nova Scotia. He was the leader of the Co-operative Commonwealth Federation in Nova Scotia from 1945 until 1953.  He succeeded Donald MacDonald as the party's leader, after MacDonald lost his seat in the 1945 general election.
He represented the electoral district (riding) of Cape Breton East in the Nova Scotia House of Assembly from 1945 until 1956.  Due to the Conservatives not electing a single member to the Assembly, Cunningham became the leader of the Official Opposition during the 44th General Assembly of Nova Scotia.  Even though the CCF lost a seat, it was the first time they ever were the Official Opposition. Their successor party, the Nova Scotia New Democratic Party (NDP) would not duplicate that accomplishment again until 1998, over 50 years later.

He was born in Glace Bay, Nova Scotia in 1904. Mr. Cunningham met and Married Violet Miller and had eight children. Shirley (Pettigrew), Joan (Roberts), Marilyn (Wheeliker), Robert, David, Donald, Clarence, and Kenneth. They began their wedded life purchasing the Bradbury farm on Big Glace Bay Lake. They moved on to a farm property at Sand Lake and then, in December 1945, purchased the Marconi property (including the radio station VAS, Voice of the Atlantic Seaboard)  a few miles out of Glace Bay, NS where they raised their family and resided until he died in 1985 and she in 1989.

References and notes

See also
 Co-operative Commonwealth Federation
 List of Nova Scotia CCF/NDP members

Nova Scotia New Democratic Party MLAs
Leaders of the Nova Scotia CCF/NDP
People from Cape Breton Island
Nova Scotia Co-operative Commonwealth Federation MLAs
20th-century Canadian legislators
1905 births
1985 deaths